Luigi Caccia Dominioni (7 December 1913 – 13 November 2016) was an Italian architect and furniture designer.

Life 

Caccia Dominioni was born on 7 December 1913 in Milan, in Lombardy in northern Italy, to Ambrogio Caccia Dominioni, a lawyer, and Maria Paravicini; the family was a noble one, with origins in Novara, in Piemonte.

Caccia Dominioni graduated from the Politecnico di Milano in 1936, and opened a studio with two fellow-students, Livio and Pier Giacomo Castiglioni. He was in the Italian army during the Second World War, but when the puppet Republic of Salò was established in 1943, he refused to recognise it and fled to Switzerland. After the war he returned to Milan and, with Corrado Corradi Dell'Acqua and Ignazio Gardella, started Azucena, a company which designed both furniture and furnishings such as door-handles and lamps.

Work 

Caccia Dominioni designed many buildings in Milan, notably overseeing the internal restructuring of the Biblioteca and the Pinacoteca Ambrosiana. Between 1976 and 1983 he worked on the Parc Saint Roman, a residential complex in Monte Carlo.

Death 

Caccia Dominioni died on 13 November 2016 in Milan, Italy.

References 

1913 births
2016 deaths
Architects from Milan
Polytechnic University of Milan alumni
20th-century Italian architects
Italian centenarians
Italian furniture designers
Men centenarians
Compasso d'Oro Award recipients